Los Andes may refer to:

Places
The Andes, a mountain range in South America
Los Andes Department, Salta Province, Argentina
National Territory of Los Andes, a former national territory of Argentina that has since been incorporated into Catamarca, Jujuy and Salta provinces
Los Andes Province (Bolivia), La Paz Department
Los Andes, Chile, a city and commune in Los Andes Province, Valparaíso Region, Chile
Los Andes Province, Chile, Valparaíso Region, Chile
Los Andes, Nariño, a town and municipality in Nariño Department, Colombia

Other uses
ARA Los Andes, an Argentine Navy vessel, active 1875–1927
Club Atletico Los Andes, a football club based in Lomas de Zamora, Argentina
C.D. Los Andes, a football club based in San Jorge, San Miguel, El Salvador
Los Andes de Lomas de Zamora, a football club based in Greater Buenos Aires, Argentina
Los Andes (Argentine newspaper), a daily newspaper published in Mendoza, Argentina
Universidad de los Andes (disambiguation)

See also
Andes (disambiguation)